Cloud County (county code CD) is a county located in the U.S. state of Kansas. As of the 2020 census, the county population was 9,032. Its county seat and most populous city is Concordia.

History

Early history

For many millennia, the Great Plains of North America was inhabited by nomadic Native Americans.  From the 16th century to 18th century, the Kingdom of France claimed ownership of large parts of North America.  In 1762, after the French and Indian War, France secretly ceded New France to Spain, per the Treaty of Fontainebleau.

19th century
In 1802, Spain returned most of the land to France, but keeping title to about 7,500 square miles.  In 1803, most of the land for modern day Kansas was acquired by the United States from France as part of the 828,000 square mile Louisiana Purchase for 2.83 cents per acre.

In 1854, the Kansas Territory was organized, then in 1861 Kansas became the 34th U.S. state.  In 1867, Cloud County was established.

Cloud county was originally named Shirley County, but civic leaders feared that sounded too much like the name of a prostitute. It was then renamed "Cloud" county in honor of Colonel William F. Cloud.

Cloud County was formed from the existing Washington County, Kansas in a joint convention with Republic and Cloud counties.  The county was legally organized on September 6, 1866, with Elk Creek designated as the temporary county seat.

In 1887, Atchison, Topeka and Santa Fe Railway built a branch line from Neva (3 miles west of Strong City) to Superior, Nebraska.  This branch line connected Strong City, Neva, Rockland, Diamond Springs, Burdick, Lost Springs, Jacobs, Hope, Navarre, Enterprise, Abilene, Talmage, Manchester, Longford, Oak Hill, Miltonvale, Aurora, Huscher, Concordia, Kackley, Courtland, Webber, Superior.  At some point, the line from Neva to Lost Springs was pulled but the right of way has not been abandoned.  This branch line was originally called "Strong City and Superior line" but later the name was shortened to the "Strong City line".  In 1996, the Atchison, Topeka and Santa Fe Railway merged with Burlington Northern Railroad and renamed to the current BNSF Railway. Most locals still refer to this railroad as the "Santa Fe".

Geography

Geographic features
The Republican River passes through the county, entering from Republic County to the north and exiting to Clay County to the east. The Solomon River traverses the southwestern portion of the county, going from Mitchell County to Ottawa County. Jamestown Lake lies partially in the northwestern part of the county and partially in southwestern Republic county.

Major highways
Cloud County is bisected from north to south by U.S. Route 81, which runs through the town of Concordia and connects north to Belleville, Kansas or south to Salina, Kansas.  The southern part of the county also has U.S. Route 24, connecting Clay Center, Kansas from the east and Beloit, Kansas to the west.

There are four other state highways in the county: K-9, K-28, K-189, and K-194.

Adjacent counties
 Republic County (north)
 Washington County (northeast)
 Clay County (east)
 Ottawa County (south)
 Mitchell County (west)
 Jewell County (northwest)

Demographics

 

As of the 2000 census, there were 10,268 people, 4,163 households, and 2,697 families residing in the county.  The population density was 14 people per square mile (6/km2).  There were 4,838 housing units at an average density of 7 per square mile (3/km2).  The racial makeup of the county was 98.30% White, 0.34% Black or African American, 0.25% Native American, 0.25% Asian, 0.13% from other races, and 0.73% from two or more races. Hispanic or Latino of any race were 0.60% of the population.

There were 4,163 households, out of which 27.10% had children under the age of 18 living with them, 55.10% were married couples living together, 6.60% had a female householder with no husband present, and 35.20% were non-families. 30.80% of all households were made up of individuals, and 15.90% had someone living alone who was 65 years of age or older.  The average household size was 2.31 and the average family size was 2.89.

In the county, the population was spread out, with 22.40% under the age of 18, 10.40% from 18 to 24, 21.90% from 25 to 44, 22.20% from 45 to 64, and 23.20% who were 65 years of age or older.  The median age was 41 years. For every 100 females there were 90.60 males.  For every 100 females age 18 and over, there were 86.60 males.

The median income for a household in the county was $31,758, and the median income for a family was $39,745. Males had a median income of $27,166 versus $20,114 for females. The per capita income for the county was $17,536.  About 6.40% of families and 10.80% of the population were below the poverty line, including 12.10% of those under age 18 and 8.70% of those age 65 or over.

Government

Presidential elections
Cloud County is a Republican Stronghold. The Last democrat to carry this county was Jimmy Carter in 1976.

Laws
Following amendment to the Kansas Constitution in 1986, Cloud County remained a prohibition, or "dry", county until 1998, when voters approved the sale of alcoholic liquor by the individual drink with a 30 percent food sales requirement.

Education

Colleges
 Cloud County Community College in Concordia
 Historic
 Miltonvale Wesleyan College (closed 1972)
 Concordia Normal School (closed 1876)
 Concordia Business College (closed sometime after 1930)

Unified school districts
 Clifton-Clyde USD 224
 Concordia USD 333
 Southern Cloud USD 334

Communities

Cities
 Aurora
 Clyde
 Concordia
 Glasco
 Jamestown
 Miltonvale
 Simpson (partly in Mitchell County)

Unincorporated communities
† means a Census-Designated Place (CDP) by the United States Census Bureau.
 Ames†
 Hollis
 Huscher
 Rice
 St. Joseph

Ghost towns
 Macyville
 Sibley
 Yuma

Townships
Cloud County is divided into eighteen townships.  The city of Concordia is considered governmentally independent and is excluded from the census figures for the townships.  In the following table, the population center is the largest city (or cities) included in that township's population total, if it is of a significant size.

Notable people

See List of people from Cloud County, Kansas

Charles H. Blosser was an aviator who was awarded the Kansas Governor's Aviation Honors Award and was inducted into the Kansas Aviation Hall of Fame in 1990.  At one time, he was the oldest living licensed pilot in the United States.

Napoleon Bonaparte Brown was a soldier, businessman, politician, and resident of Kansas and Missouri in the late 19th and early 20th centuries. He is most known as the namesake and builder of the Brown Grand Theatre in Concordia, Kansas, a majestic opera house completed in 1907 and listed on the National Register of Historic Places.  The theater has been called "the most elegant theater between Kansas City and Denver."

Frank Carlson was an American politician who served as the 30th Governor of Kansas and United States Representative and United States Senator from Kansas.  He called Concordia his home.

Larry Hartshorn was a former NFL Offensive Guard who played for the Chicago Cardinals in 1955 and 1957.  He later played in the Canadian Football League with the Calgary Stampeders in 1958.  After his years in professional football, Hartshorn moved to Concordia to become a teacher and coach for 33 years at Concordia Junior-Senior High School, where he coached Keith Christensen.  Hartshorn began the wrestling program in 1966, running it as head coach from 1966 to 1974.  He continued to serve in various coaching and education capacities until his retirement.

Ernest C. Quigley was a basketball referee and as an umpire in Major League Baseball.  He also worked as an American football coach and official.  Quigley was raised in Concordia, Kansas where he was a prominent member of the high school football team in the 1890s. In 1944 he became the athletic director at the University of Kansas.

Popular culture
Cloud County has also been listed as one of the locations for Smallville in the Superman story line.

See also
 National Register of Historic Places listings in Cloud County, Kansas
 List of people from Cloud County, Kansas

References

Further reading

 Standard Atlas of Cloud County, Kansas; Geo. A. Ogle & Co; 89 pages; 1917.
 Standard Atlas of Cloud County, Kansas; Geo. A. Ogle & Co; 56 pages; 1901.
 Edward's Atlas of Cloud County, Kansas; John P. Edwards; 43 pages; 1885.

External links

County
 
 Cloud County – Directory of Public Officials
Maps
 Cloud County Maps: Current, Historic, KDOT
 Kansas Highway Maps: Current, Historic, KDOT
 Kansas Railroad Maps: Current, 1996, 1915, KDOT and Kansas Historical Society

 
Kansas counties
1867 establishments in Kansas
Populated places established in 1867